Stockdale High School (SHS) is an American senior high school located in Bakersfield, California. Its athletics teams are known as the Stockdale Mustangs and the school colors are black and silver. Stockdale High School first opened in 1991. Now in its 28th year, with approximately 2,069 students enrolled, Stockdale has an API of 831. Sixty-four sections of GATE, Honors, and Advanced Placement classes are offered for the college-bound. For students interested in career pathways, eight courses are offered, including Agricultural Science and Technology, Applied Engineering and Design, Computer and Commercial Graphics, Computer Science and Information Systems, Accounting and Finance, Medicine (M.A.S.H., the Medical Academy of Stockdale High), Virtual Business Enterprise, and Construction Technology. The school motto is "Branded by Excellence." In 2010, Newsweek ranked Stockdale among the top 6 percent of all public schools in the United States.

Associated Student Body

Stockdale High School's official student governing body is the Associated Student Body (ASB). The ASB Executive Board is made up of two representatives from each class as well as a panel of board members elected by the students. The Executive Board oversees all dances, clubs, student groups, activities, community service, and various other school events.

Programs

Forensics (speech and debate)
Forensics is an elective at Stockdale High. They won the Valley Title in Debate 2002, 2014, 2015, 2016, 2017, 2018, 2019, 2020, and 2021 and the Speech Valley Title in 2016 and 2021. The program teaches students oral argument, rhetoric, and persuasive skills. The current Stockdale Forensics Coach is Crystal Huddleston.

National Honor Society
The NHS at Stockdale is the primary community service organization on campus and includes over 590 students as members. The club was awarded national recognition in 2015 as one of five chapters in the country chosen for the Outstanding Service Project award for Welcome Home. They have also won Beautiful Bakersfield awards and PEAAK awards.

Medical Academy and HOSA
The Medical Academy of Stockdale High (MASH) has its own Health Occupation Students of America club (HOSA). Students enter the academy their freshman year and take special medical classes until completion in the senior year.

Math Club
The Math Club meets once every week to do many different math related activities. It hosts the CAML, a math competition, as well as the AMC.

Model United Nations (MUN)
MUN is a club at Stockdale. Students meet once a week to practice their speaking skills and critical thinking, while participating in competitions.

Notable alumni

David Carr, former quarterback for the Houston Texans, and first overall pick. Now retired.
Grant Desme, centerfielder at Cal Poly San Luis Obispo (Big West Conference Player of the Year); drafted in 2007 by the Oakland Athletics; retired in 2010 after being named Arizona Fall League MVP, to enter a Catholic seminary to study for the priesthood.
Casey Mears, NASCAR driver
Cory Hall, former NFL free safety for the Cincinnati Bengals attended Stockdale High School his freshman through junior year before transferring to South High School.
Sam Betty, European basketball star and stand-out two-sport Division III-A athlete at Occidental College

District

Stockdale High School is a part of the Kern High School District, one of the largest high school districts in the state of California. Stockdale High's boundaries cover much of the southwest corner of Bakersfield, California.

References

External links
Stockdale High School
Kern High School District
Stockdale's official Twitter account

Public high schools in California
High schools in Bakersfield, California
1991 establishments in California
Educational institutions established in 1991